The Last Duel: A True Story of Crime, Scandal, and Trial by Combat in Medieval France is a 2004 book by American author Eric Jager about one of the last officially recognized judicial duels fought in France. In 2021, director Ridley Scott adapted the book as a movie called The Last Duel.

Plot 
The story tells of the 29 December 1386, trial by combat (duel) in which the Norman knight Jean de Carrouges dueled squire Jacques Le Gris. Carrouges had accused Le Gris of raping his wife, Marguerite de Carrouges, née de Thibouville, some months before. He had gone to King Charles VI, seeking an appeal to the decision handed down by Count Pierre d'Alençon, who Carrouges believed favoured Le Gris. Whichever combatant was still alive at the end of the duel would be declared the winner, as a sign of God's will. If Jean de Carrouges had lost the duel, his wife would have been burned at the stake, as punishment for her false accusation.

In the centuries since Le Gris's death, the case has become an important cultural legend in France, and the guilt or innocence of its participants has been a source of great debate among historians and jurists.

Though this was the final judicial duel held in France, it was not the last legal duel. Subsequently authorised duels were not judicial duels deciding the guilt and innocence of the participants, but duels for honour to avenge an affront.
The last duel to be publicly authorised took place on 10 July 1547 at the castle of Saint-Germain-en-Laye: it opposed Guy Chabot de Jarnac against François de Vivonne, following a request by Jarnac to King Henry II for permission to duel to regain his honour. Jarnac went on to win the duel after injuring Vivonne. Vivonne later died of the sword wounds inflicted by Jarnac during the duel.

Adaptations 
An abridged version of the book was read by Robert Glenister on BBC Radio 4 as Book of the Week between Monday 10 and Friday 14 January 2005.

The Last Duel, a drama documentary based on the book and including comments by Jager, was broadcast by BBC Four as part of a medieval-themed season on 24 April 2008.

A film adaptation of the novel was announced in July 2019 to be directed by Ridley Scott, with Ben Affleck and Matt Damon as stars, co-writers, and producers. Its originally scheduled Christmas 2020 release was postponed due to the COVID-19 pandemic to 15 October 2021.

References 

Works about dueling
Trials by combat
Works set in the 14th century
History books about the Middle Ages